Fibroblast growth factor 14 is a biologically active protein that in humans is encoded by the FGF14 gene.

The protein encoded by this gene is a member of the fibroblast growth factor (FGF) family. FGF family members possess broad mitogenic and cell survival activities and are involved in a variety of biological processes, including embryonic development, cell growth, morphogenesis, tissue repair, tumor growth, and invasion. A mutation in this gene is associated with autosomal dominant cerebral ataxia. Alternatively spliced transcript variants have been found for this gene.

FGF14 is mainly expressed in the central nervous system and is associated with neurodegenerative diseases such as spinocerebellar ataxia (SAC27). FGF14 deficiency also impairs the maturation of cells in the hippocampus, which is possibly related to the development of schizophrenia.

Relationship with Alzheimer's disease 
FGF14 levels are elevated in patients with Alzheimer's disease. FGF14 messenger RNA was also found to be upregulated in Alzheimer's patients, which suggests that it is involved in the pathogenesis of the disease, although the underlying mechanism is still unknown. Research is ongoing as to whether or not FGF14 could be used as a therapy against Alzheimer's disease as well as other neurodegenerative diseases, by promote neural proliferation and regulating the plasticity of the synapses.

References

Further reading